The King's Daughter, Soo Baek-hyang is a Korean-language historical drama depicting the life of Soo Baek-hyang, the daughter of King Muryeong of Baekje. It was aired on MBC TV from September 30, 2013, to March 14, 2014, on Monday and Friday at 20:55 (KST). The series was scheduled have 120 episodes, but it was reduced to 108 on March 4, 2014.

Plot
Yung is a successful general in the army of his cousin King Dongseong. He is in love with Chae-hwa, the daughter of a court official named Baek-ga. Baek-ga is committed to bringing Yung to the throne, with his daughter as the queen. When he is accused of the king's murder, the two lovers are forced apart. Chae-hwa is taken to Gaya by a servant, Goo-chun, and there she gives birth to Yung's daughter, Seol-nan. She subsequently marries the man who had saved her and, some years later, gives birth to a second child, Seol-hee. In the meantime, Yung, who believes that his lover is dead, ascends the throne as Muryeong. In an attempt to protect Jin-moo, the son of the former King Dongseong, Yung exchanges his own son, Myung-nong, for Jin-moo. Years later, simple-minded Seol-nan falls in love with Myung-nong, while her ambitious sister Seol-hee tries to become the princess.

Cast

Main cast
Seo Hyun-jin as Soo Baek-hyang / Seol-nan
Seo Woo as Seol-hee
Lee Jae-ryong as King Muryeong
Jo Hyun-jae as Myung-nong, later King Seong
Jeon Jin-seo as teenage Myung-nong
Seol Woo-hyung as child Myung-nong
Jun Tae-soo as Jin-moo
Myung Se-bin as Chae-hwa
Yoon Tae-young as Goo-chun

Supporting

Bi Moon
Cha Hwa-yeon as Do-rim
Kim Roi-ha as Ttol-dae
Kim Min-kyo as Mang-goo
Sung Ji-ru as Dae-woon

Royal palace
Jung Sung-mo as Nae-sook
Im Se-mi as Queen Eun-hye
Hwang Young-hee as Gong-ok
Jung Suk-yong as Hong-rim
Lee Ki-young as King Gaero
Jung Chan as King Dongseong

Extended

Ahn Suk-hwan as Baek-ga
Kim Young-jae as Soo Ni-moon
Yeo Eui-joo as Kang-bok
Choi Bum-ho as Yeo-mok
Lee Hye-eun as Lady So-jung
Kim Byung-ok as Yeon Bool-tae
Jeon Shin-hwan as Woo-chi
Jang Myung-gap as Moo-baek
Lee Dong-yoon as Yong-goo
Choi Joon-hyuk as Kko-mak
Lee Choong-shik as Duk-swe
Lee Chang-jik as Choi Man-chi
Seo Yi-sook as Mrs. Yong-goo
Ga Deuk-hee as Na-eun
Park Hee-jin as Mrs. Kko-mak / Inn auntie
Woo Sang-jun as Sangjwapyeong elderly
Song Min-hyung as Eun-sol
Lee Mi-do as Mak-geum
Jung Ui-kap as Eul-mil
Moo Jin-sung as Kang Bok
Hong Yeo-jin as Gaya Ki Moon Bureau noble's wife
Seo Kwang-jae as Gaya Ki Moon Bureau noble
Choi Ro-woon as orphaned boy
Kwon Sung-guk as Baekje doctor
Lee Jae-goo as Ki Moon Administration official
Lee Seung-won as butler
Ki Se-hyung as Moo-man
Min Joon-hyun as Uk-chool
Oh Dae-hwan as Doo-mok
 Park Sung-joon
 Jung Man-sik

Original soundtrack

OST Part 1

OST Part 2

Ratings
 In this table,  represent the lowest ratings and  represent the highest ratings.

Awards and nominations

References

External links
 
The King's Daughter, Soo Baek-hyang at MBC Global Media

2013 South Korean television series debuts
2013 South Korean television series endings
Korean-language television shows
MBC TV television dramas
South Korean historical television series